The 1951–52 Spartan League season was the 34th in the history of Spartan League. The league consisted of 14 teams.

League table

The division featured 14 teams, 8 from last season and 6 new teams:
 Histon Institute
 Hemel Hempstead
 Wood Green Town
 Upminster
 Hoddesdon Town
 Marlow

References

1951–52
9